Psammopolia ochracea is a moth of the family Noctuidae. It is found in coastal California between San Francisco and Los Angeles.

It occurs on sand beaches and is nocturnal.

Adults are on wing in September and October.

External links
A Revision of Lasionycta Aurivillius (Lepidoptera, Noctuidae) for North America and notes on Eurasian species, with descriptions of 17 new species, 6 new subspecies, a new genus, and two new species of Tricholita Grote

Hadeninae